Adin Shah Kot is a town in the Federally Administered Tribal Areas of Pakistan. It is located at 32°59'1N 70°11'24E with an altitude of 718 metres (2358 feet).

References

Populated places in Khyber Pakhtunkhwa